Sultan Ali Allana is a Pakistani banker. He is the Director of the Aga Khan Fund for Economic Development and the Chairman of Habib Bank Limited.

Early life and education 
Sultan Ali Allana was born in Karachi, in 1959. He attended St. Patrick's High School, DJ Science college and then moved to Canada where he obtained an undergraduate degree in Mechanical Engineering and a postgraduate diploma in Management from the McGill University. He then attended the University of Wisconsin, USA, where he obtained an MS in Management Technology.

Career 
He started his career in banking in 1985 with Citibank and in 1994 he founded Global Securities, a former joint venture partner of UBS AG. In 1999 he acquired a management stake in NDLC and was appointed as CEO of the company. NDLC later merged with IFIC Bank to form NIB Bank in October 2003.

As part of a structural reform process, he worked with the Government of Pakistan in 2000 which allowed for the creation of Micro Finance Banks in Pakistan. As a result of the enabling framework, the First Microfinance Bank was established in 2002 and Sultan Ali Allana was appointed as its first Chairman (2002-2006)

In 2003 he volunteered for the Aga Khan Fund for Economic Development (AKFED) to oversee the Fund’s investments in banking, insurance and aviation, and later joined the organization.

In 2004 he was appointed as the Chairman's of Habib Bank Limited after its privatization.

Personal life 
Sultan Ali Allana comes from a prominent family of Sindh. His late uncle G.Allana was a friend and biographer of Mohammad Ali Jinnah, Founder of Pakistan. He entered politics at an early age and played an active part in the Pakistan movement. G. Allana has written several books notably: The Story of a Nation, Our Freedom Fighters, Pakistan Movement, A Rosary of Islamic Readings & His Highness Aga Khan III.

He is currently a member of the Steering committee of Artists' Welfare Fund and has also served as the Member of the Economic Advisory Council ( EAC )-2022. In addition, Sultan Ali Allana has held the following honorary positions with various ministries and divisions of the Government of Pakistan.

(i)     Member of the Special Cell/Think Tank on COVID-19 constituted by the Finance Division - 2020;

(ii)   Member of the CPEC Business Council constituted by the Chairman of the Board of Investment – 2020;

(iii)   Member of the Economic Advisory council constituted by the Finance Division – 2018;

(iv)  Member of the Advisory Council for the Ministry of Maritime Affairs – 2018;

Awards 
He was awarded the Sitara-e-Imtiaz in 2006 for "valuable services for Pakistan", in the economic and financial sector, specifically with reference to the creation of the framework MicroFinance institutions in the country and for the establishment of the First Micro Finance Bank.

References

1959 births
Living people
Pakistani economists
Pakistani bankers
Recipients of Sitara-e-Jurat
D. J. Sindh Government Science College alumni